Divithura is a 2021 Sri Lankan reality thriller teledrama broadcast on Hiru TV. The series is directed by Chamara Jayaweera, produced by Hiru TV and created by Kaushalya Pathirana. It was released on 23 April 2021 and continues in every weekday from Monday to Friday at 8:00 pm to 8:30 pm.

The teledrama stars popular singer Hector Dias in acting debut along with Shanudrie Priyasad and Himali Sayurangi in lead roles. The supportive cast include popular singer Athula Adikari, Sujeewa Priyal, Soorya Dayaruwan, Nilushi Pawanya and Sarath Karunarathne whereas veteran songstress Chandrika Siriwardena also made her acting debut.

Plot 
The drama revolves around a reality program. The program owner, Themiya has chosen three judges including famous singer, Agasti. Agasti has an illegitimate daughter, Esha, but refuses to reveal it. On the other hand, Esha who was told by her mother that her father was met with an accident, finds out that Agasti is her actual father. After that, Esha decides to join with the reality program to revenge upon her father as the reason of she was orphaned by father 20 years before.

In the first selections Esha did not get a chance, therefore she scolds Agasthi in the stage, Themiya requests Esha to rejoin the programme as he realizes that Esha is the only way to get  revenge upon Agasthi. In the next round Esha gets selected with the votes of Wajira and Agathi's fiancée Windy. Due to this clashes happen between Agasthi and Windy but she regrets it. Esha's mother loved Agathi for years and Thatupathi, a heartbroken musician loved Samadi for years among them Samadi chooses Agasthi. But after Agasthi goes to Bhathkande university to study music he quickly forgets Samadi.

Esha learns music from Tharupathi. There he meets Udul who builds up a crush with Esha. Also Ududl's half brother Vishal, a rising star contestant builds a crush with Esha as well. In the rising star Esha meets Rehana, a rap singer she helps Esha to solve the problems with Kavya a stubborn contestant in the same reality show.

In the next round Esha gets selected from the votes of all three judges Wajra, Windy and Subhani whom Themiya selected by playing a nasty plan. Agasthi gets angry with Windy and  disappears for three days. In the next round Esha gets selected by the Wajira's golden buzzer opportunity. In the fourth rounds Esha decides to reveal her secret to the country on the stage.

Cast and characters

Main cast 
 Hector Dias as Agasthi Adikari, a popular singer and Esha's father 
 Shanudrie Priyasad as Esha Dunusinghe 
 Himali Sayurangi as Samadhi Dunusinghe , Esha's mother
 Sujeewa Priyal Yaddehige as Themiya

Supportive cast
 Soorya Dayaruwan as Udul
 Athula Adikari as Tharupathi
 Sarath Karunarathne as Sameera 
 Sanjana Gamaarachchi as Teena 
 Nilushi Pawanya as Vindy
 Duleeka Marapana as Deepika, Themiya's wife
 Darshan Dharmaraj was an MP before he died
 Chandrika Siriwardena as Vajira
 Sulochana Weerasinghe as Nilu
 Sampath Tennakoon was Samadhi's father (deceased) Now Cletus Mendis acts for Samadhi's father.
 Pathum Rukshan as Ashan, the program host
Lucky Dias as Vicky Randeniya, new director of Life TV and Themiya's media guru.

Minor cast
 Sanet Dikkumbura as Raja
 Sudeeksha Perera as Rehana
 Wageesha Salgadu as Kavya 
 Kelum Sri as Vishal 
 Janaka Kumbukage as Vipula, Vishal's father
 Nayana Kumari as Vishal's mother
 Hyacinth Wijeratne as Udul's grandmother (deceased)
 Freewhil Alagendra
 Yohan Perera as Udul's friend
 Ashan Sanjaya as Young Agasthi
 Dulshara de Alwis as Young Samadhi
 Dilshan Maduranga as Young Tharupathi
 Rex Hamilton
 Ronika Chamali as Ganesh's mother
 A. K. Ilango as Ganesh's father
 Vijaya Roshan
 Maasha Nuwangi as Bhagya
 Kumudu Nishantha as Doctor
 Subhani Harshani in special appearance
 Raju Bandara in special appearance

Teledrama Songs 
 Sihiaye Sathsare by Hector Dias 
 Mama Hithak Ridawa by Athula Adikari

Accident
On 30 July 2021, veteran actress Hyacinth Wijeratne died at the age of 75 after succumbing to severe injuries during a fatal road accident at Lindula, Thalawakala. She met with the accident, after finishing her shooting schedule in the teledrama, and was returning to Colombo in the early morning. She played the role as the "grandmother of Udul" in the series.

See also 
 Nadagamkarayo

References 

Sri Lankan television shows
2021 Sri Lankan television series debuts